Victor Rusu (born 23 August 1945) is a Romanian weightlifter. He competed in the men's bantamweight event at the 1972 Summer Olympics.

References

External links
 

1945 births
Living people
Romanian male weightlifters
Olympic weightlifters of Romania
Weightlifters at the 1972 Summer Olympics
Sportspeople from Cluj-Napoca
20th-century Romanian people
21st-century Romanian people